Miloš Brajović (Serbian Cyrillic: Милош Брајовић; born 2 August 1996) is a Serbian football defender who plays for Železničar Pančevo.

Club career

Red Star Belgrade
He made his professional debut for Red Star Belgrade on 26 May 2013, in Serbian SuperLiga match versus Vojvodina.

References

External links
 Profile at Red Star Belgrade official website
 
 
 
 Stats at Utakmica.rs

Living people
Sportspeople from Pančevo
1996 births
Association football defenders
Serbian footballers
Red Star Belgrade footballers
FK Dinamo Pančevo players
FK Kolubara players
FK Proleter Novi Sad players
FK Brodarac players
FK Železničar Pančevo players
Serbian SuperLiga players
Serbian First League players